= Sandra Petersmann =

- Occupation: Radio correspondent
- Employers: Deutsche Welle; Westdeutscher Rundfunk

Sandra Petersmann (born 1972 in Hamm in Westphalia) is a German radio correspondent for Westdeutscher Rundfunk.

== Life ==
Petersmann studied politics and history in Hanover from 1991, and was active in radio during her studies. In 1996 she spent a semester abroad in Johannesburg.

After her return from South Africa she volunteered at Deutsche Welle (DW), and then became an editor. She reported for DW mainly from crisis areas, where her path regularly intersected with those of the ARD correspondents. After that she joined the correspondent network of the ARD and reported on South Asia from New Delhi. Since her return in early 2017, she has worked for Deutsche Welle in Berlin.
